Thomas Lasvenes (born 6 May 1996) is a French rugby league footballer currently for Villeneuve Leopards in the Elite One Championship. He previously played for the Limoux Grizzlies and represented France in the 2019 Rugby League World Cup 9s.

Playing career

Villeneuve XIII RLLG
On 24 Jul 2019 it was reported that he had signed for Villeneuve XIII RLLG in the Elite One Championship

References

External links
Thomas Lasvenes Thirteen World profile

1996 births
Living people
French rugby league players
Limoux Grizzlies players
Villeneuve Leopards players
Rugby league fullbacks